Gate is a compilation album by German electronic composer Peter Frohmader, released in 1995 by Atonal Records.

Track listing

Personnel
Adapted from the Gate liner notes.
 Peter Frohmader – fretless bass guitar, sampler, synthesizer, production

Release history

References 

1995 compilation albums
Peter Frohmader albums